Nogometni Klub Ivančica Ivanec, commonly referred to as NK Ivančica or simply Ivančica, was a Croatian football club based in the town of Ivanec.

Association football clubs established in 1934
Football clubs in Croatia
Football clubs in Varaždin County
Defunct football clubs in Croatia
Association football clubs disestablished in 2013
1934 establishments in Croatia
2013 disestablishments in Croatia